Little Dover  is a small community in the Canadian province of Nova Scotia, founded in 1860 and located in  The Municipality of the District of Guysborough in Guysborough County.

References
Little Dover on Destination Nova Scotia

Communities in Guysborough County, Nova Scotia
General Service Areas in Nova Scotia